The following lists events that happened during  1959 in New Zealand.

Population
 Estimated population as of 31 December: 2,359,700
 Increase since 31 December 1958: 43,700 (1.89%)
 Males per 100 females: 101.0

Incumbents

Regal and viceregal
Head of State – Elizabeth II
Governor-General – The Viscount Cobham GCMG TD.

Government
The 32nd New Zealand Parliament continued.  In power was the Labour government led by Walter Nash.

Speaker of the House – Robert Macfarlane
Prime Minister – Walter Nash
Deputy Prime Minister – Jerry Skinner.
Minister of Finance – Arnold Nordmeyer.
Minister of Foreign Affairs – Walter Nash.
Attorney-General – Rex Mason.
Chief Justice — Sir Harold Barrowclough

Parliamentary opposition 
 Leader of the Opposition –   Keith Holyoake (National).

Main centre leaders
Mayor of Auckland – Keith Buttle then Dove-Myer Robinson
Mayor of Hamilton – Roderick Braithwaite then Denis Rogers
Mayor of Wellington – Frank Kitts
Mayor of Christchurch – George Manning
Mayor of Dunedin – Leonard Morton Wright then Stuart Sidey

Events 
 30 May: The Auckland Harbour Bridge is opened.
 24 November: The coastal trader MV Holmglen sinks near Timaru with the loss of 15 lives.

Arts and literature
Ian Cross wins the first Robert Burns Fellowship.

See 1959 in art, 1959 in literature

Music

See: 1959 in music

Radio
See: Public broadcasting in New Zealand

Film

See: :Category:1959 film awards, 1959 in film, List of New Zealand feature films, Cinema of New Zealand, :Category:1959 films

Sport

Athletics
Ray Puckett wins his second national title in the men's marathon, clocking 2:27:28.2 on 7 March in Palmerston North.

Chess
 The 66th National Chess Championship was held in Hamilton. The title was shared between F.A. Foulds and B.C. Menzies, both of Auckland.

Horse racing

Harness racing
 New Zealand Trotting Cup – False Step (2nd win)
 Auckland Trotting Cup – Scottish Command

Lawn bowls
The national outdoor lawn bowls championships are held in Wellington.
 Men's singles champion – W.R. Fleming Sr (Tuakau Bowling Club)
 Men's pair champions – G. Bradley, H.J. Thompson (skip) (Whitiora Bowling Club)
 Men's fours champions – T. Sunde, C. Hill, A. Sunde, M.A. Marinovich (skip) (Oratia Bowling Club)

Rugby union
 The British Lions team toured New Zealand, losing the Test series 3–1. They also lost two of their 21 provincial games, to Canterbury and Otago.
 18 July, Carisbrook, Dunedin: New Zealand 18 – 17 British Isles
 15 August, Athletic Park, Wellington: New Zealand 11 – 8 British Isles
 29 August, Lancaster Park, Christchurch: New Zealand 22 – 8 British Isles
 19 September, Eden Park, Auckland: New Zealand 6 – 9 British Isles

Soccer
 The national men's team played one match against a visiting Costa Rican club side:
 6 June, Auckland: NZ 3 – 2 Deportivo Saprissa
 The Chatham Cup was won by Dunedin team Northern who beat North Shore United 3–2 in the final.
 Provincial league champions:
	Auckland:	North Shore United
	Bay of Plenty:	Kahukura
	Buller:	Denniston Hotspurs
	Canterbury:	Western
	Hawke's Bay:	Napier Athletic
	Manawatu:	Kiwi United
	Marlborough:	Woodbourne
	Nelson:	Rangers
	Northland:	Otangarei United
	Otago:	Northern AFC
	Poverty Bay:	Eastern Union
	South Canterbury:	West End
	Southland:	Rovers
	Taranaki:	Moturoa
	Waikato:	Hamilton Technical OB
	Wairarapa:	Douglas Villa
	Wanganui:	New Settlers
	Wellington:	Northern

Births
 13 April:  Justin Boyle , cricketer.
 8 May: Ingrid Jagersma, cricketer.
 9 May:  Andrew Jones , cricketer.
 16 May: Greg Johnston, rower.
 26 May:  Brett Austin , breaststroke swimmer.
 28 May: Eric Verdonk, rower.
 17 June: Vivienne Gapes, skier.
 20 August: David Howard, poet.
 4 September:  Robbie Deans , rugby player and coach.
 14 September:  Brendon Bracewell , cricketer.
 27 September:  Mark Inglis , mountaineer.
 3 November:  Vaughan Brown , cricketer.
 12 December: George Keys, rower.
  Bianca van Rangelrooy , artist.
  Harry Sinclair , actor, filmmaker and musician.

Deaths
 23 February: Gordon Wilson, Government architect.
 8 April: Sir Bill Jordan, politician and diplomat.
 8 June: George Dash, politician
 7 November: Archie Fisher, painter.
 8 November: Walter William Massey, MP and politician
 6 December (in Scotland): Edward Hunter a.k.a. Billy Banjo, trade unionist, politician and writer.

See also
List of years in New Zealand
Timeline of New Zealand history
History of New Zealand
Military history of New Zealand
Timeline of the New Zealand environment
Timeline of New Zealand's links with Antarctica

References

External links

 
Years of the 20th century in New Zealand